Walther Franz Anton von Dyck (6 December 1856 – 5 November 1934), born Dyck and later ennobled, was a German mathematician. He laid the foundations of combinatorial group theory, being the first to systematically study a group by generators and relations.

Biography

Von Dyck was a student of Felix Klein, and served as chairman of the commission publishing Klein's encyclopedia. Von Dyck was also the editor of Kepler's works.  He promoted technological education as rector of the Technische Hochschule of Munich. He was a Plenary Speaker of the ICM in 1908 at Rome.

Von Dyck is the son of the Bavarian painter Hermann Dyck.

Legacy
The Dyck language in formal language theory is named after him, as are Dyck's theorem and Dyck's surface in the theory of surfaces, together with the von Dyck groups, the Dyck tessellations, Dyck paths, and the Dyck graph.

Publications 

 .

Notes

References 

 Ulf Hashagen: Walther von Dyck (1856–1934). Mathematik, Technik und Wissenschaftsorganisation an der TH München, Franz Steiner Verlag, Stuttgart 2003,

External links
 
 

1856 births
1934 deaths
Scientists from Munich
19th-century German mathematicians
20th-century German mathematicians
German untitled nobility
Group theorists
Combinatorialists
People from the Kingdom of Bavaria
Academic staff of the Technical University of Munich
Presidents of the Technical University of Munich